Lockheed Martin Aeronautics Company is a major unit of Lockheed Martin with headquarters at Air Force Plant 4 in Fort Worth, Texas.

Lockheed Martin Aeronautics is based in Marietta, Georgia and Palmdale, California. Palmdale is home to the Advanced Development Programs (ADP), informally known as the "Skunk Works". Various subassemblies are produced at locations in Florida, Mississippi, Pennsylvania, and West Virginia.

The company draws upon the history of the former Lockheed and Martin Marietta corporations. While the formation of Lockheed Martin in 1995 was a merger of equals, by far the greatest contribution to Lockheed Martin Aeronautics was the product portfolio of Lockheed. This included the C-5, C-130, and C-141 transports as well as the F-2, F-16 (purchased from General Dynamics), F-117, F-22, and F-35 Lightning II.

The most important project by far to Lockheed Martin Aeronautics is the F-35 Lightning II (JSF). Worth a potential $200bn the initial order book is approximately 3,000 excluding almost guaranteed export orders. Lockheed also supports its F-22 air dominance fighter in USAF service.

Products
 Lockheed Martin A-4AR Fightinghawk
 Lockheed C-130 Hercules : First developed by the Lockheed Corporation in the 1950s, the Hercules is still produced as the C-130J Super Hercules. The aircraft is produced at Lockheed Martin's Marietta, Georgia facility.
 Lockheed Martin C-130J Super Hercules
 Lockheed C-141 StarLifter : First flown in 1963, the Starlifter is a strategic airlifter. The C-141 was produced at Marietta.
 Lockheed C-5 Galaxy : The C-5 is the largest strategic airlifter in the USAF inventory and one of the largest aircraft in the world. The Galaxy was produced at Lockheed's Marietta facility and it is here that the current avionics and engine modernization programs are being undertaken.
 Lockheed F-117 Nighthawk : The F-117 stealth aircraft is a product of Lockheed's Skunk Works. First flown in 1981, the aircraft has been put out of service in favor of the F-22.
 Lockheed Martin F-16 Fighting Falcon : The F-16, which made its maiden flight in December 1976, was first developed and produced by General Dynamics. In 1993, Lockheed Corporation acquired General Dynamics' Fort Worth division, the production center F-16.
 Mitsubishi F-2 : Japanese development of the Lockheed Martin F-16 Fighting Falcon, heavily modified to Japan's requirements. Lockheed Martin Aeronautics acts as subcontractor to Mitsubishi Heavy Industries.
Lockheed Martin F-21 : Tata Advanced Systems  to produce the F-21 in India.
 Lockheed Martin F-22 Raptor 
 Lockheed Martin FB-22
 Lockheed Martin F-35 Lightning II : Lockheed Martin (with partners BAE Systems and Northrop Grumman) won the contract to build the Joint Strike Fighter in 2001. With initial orders of approximately 3,000 aircraft, this is of major importance to Lockheed Martin.
 Lockheed P-3 Orion : The current maritime patrol plane of many nations, but principally the US Navy. Lockheed submitted a remanufactured P-3 design as part of the Multimission Maritime Aircraft (MMA) competition, but lost to Boeing's 737 based design.
 Lockheed S-3 Viking : The Viking was the US Navy's anti-submarine jet and also provided surveillance of surface shipping.
 T-50 Golden Eagle : The T-50 is an advanced jet trainer produced by a partnership of Lockheed Martin and Korea Aerospace Industries (KAI). The two companies have formed the T-50 International Company for export marketing.
 Lockheed U-2 : The U-2 is a single-seat, single-engine, high-altitude reconnaissance airplane which first flew in 1955.
 Lockheed Martin VH-71 Kestrel
 Lockheed Martin X-33
 Lockheed Martin X-35
 Lockheed Martin X-44 MANTA
 Lockheed Martin X-55

Gallery

See also

United States Military
Military-Industrial Complex
Sikorsky Aircraft

References

External links
 
 Yahoo Finance: Profile

Lockheed Martin
Manufacturing companies based in Fort Worth, Texas
Aircraft manufacturers of the United States